Nan Martin (July 15, 1927 – March 4, 2010) was an American actress and comedienne who starred in movies and on television.

Life and career

Early life
Born in Decatur, Illinois, and raised in Santa Monica, California, she attended Santa Monica High School.

Acting career
Her first film role was The Man in the Gray Flannel Suit (1956). Her other film roles included The Mugger (1958), For Love of Ivy (1968), Goodbye Columbus (1969), Doctor Detroit (1983), All of Me (1984), and Chuck Russell's cult film A Nightmare on Elm Street 3: Dream Warriors (1987) where she played the role of Amanda Krueger, the mother of killer Freddy Krueger. Her last film role was in Thicker than Water (2005).

On television, Martin portrayed Helen Cavanaugh on Buck James and Grace D'Angelo on Mr. Sunshine. Her other TV roles included the 1983 miniseries The Thorn Birds and the soap opera Santa Barbara. She had a recurring role on The Drew Carey Show as Mrs. Louder. She made many guest appearances on various television series, including Ben Casey, The Untouchables, Mannix, Hart to Hart, The Twilight Zone, two episodes of The Fugitive, The Invaders, the first-season Star Trek: The Next Generation episode "Haven", and in the Columbo television movie, Murder, Smoke and Shadows. In 1965, she played co-murderer Beth Fuller in the Perry Mason episode "The Case of the Fatal Fortune".

She appeared on two episodes of The Golden Girls: first as the mean-spirited and nasty Frieda Claxton, who was told to drop dead by Rose Nylund, after which she did. She also portrayed Philomena, a friend of Sophia Petrillo's from Sicily, who claimed that Dorothy was really her daughter and not Sophia's. One month after her appearance on The Golden Girls, she appeared as Valerie's mean chain-smoking Aunt Josephine on The Hogan Family. She also briefly appeared as a cranky woman in the Curb Your Enthusiasm episode "Porno Gil".

Martin's Broadway credits include The Eccentricities of a Nightingale (1976), Summer Brave (1975), Come Live With Me (1967), Under the Yum-Yum Tree (1960), Henry IV, Part I (1960), Lysistrata (1959), The Great God Brown (1959), J.B. (1958), Makropoulos Secret (1957), The Constant Wife (1951), and A Story for a Sunday Evening (1950).

Personal life
Her first husband was musical composer Robert Emmett Dolan, whom she married on March 17, 1948; they had one son, Casey Martin Dolan. Her second husband, Harry Gesner, is the father of her younger son, actor Zen Gesner.

Death
Martin died March 4, 2010, at her Malibu home, aged 82. She suffered from emphysema.

Filmography

Film

Television

References

External links

 
 
 

1927 births
2010 deaths
Actresses from Illinois
Actresses from Greater Los Angeles
American film actresses
American soap opera actresses
American stage actresses
American television actresses
Deaths from emphysema
People from Decatur, Illinois
21st-century American women